Edward Caldwell Moore (1851–1943) was an American theologian, brother of George Foot Moore and Frank Gardner Moore.

Early life and education
He was born at West Chester, Pa., the son of the Rev. William Eves Moore and his wife, Harriet. He graduated from Marietta College in 1877 and from Union Theological Seminary in 1884; and studied at Berlin, Göttingen, and Gießen from 1884–1886. He received an honorary PhD from Brown University in 1891.

Career
Ordained to the Presbyterian ministry in 1884, he was pastor at the Westminster Presbyterian Church in Yonkers, N. Y. (1886–1889), and at the Central Congregational Church of Providence, R. I. (1889–1901), where he led the church in constructing a new building. In the latter year he became Parkman professor of theology at Harvard, where he was university preacher in 1905–1906. In 1914 he was elected president of the American Board of Commissioners for Foreign Missions. His publications include The New Testament in the Christian Church (1904) and An Outline of the History of Christian Thought since Kant (1912)

References

External links
 The Harvard Divinity School Library at Harvard Divinity School in Cambridge, Massachusetts holds the records of Edward Caldwell Moore.
Lectures on theologians and religious history
Letters from Moore's mother and father, letters about his trip to Labrador in 1905, and about his trip to China in 1907
Papers including sermons, addresses, lectures, prayers, biographical files, and correspondence
Papers including personal scrapbooks, diaries, journals, and correspondence
 
 

American Presbyterians
American theologians
Harvard University faculty
Brown University alumni
1857 births
1943 deaths